Baisha is a town of Shuangliu District, Chengdu, Sichuan, China. , it has one residential community and 8 villages under its administration.

See also 
 List of township-level divisions of Sichuan

References 

Towns in Sichuan
Geography of Chengdu